Haydn Sharp (20 October 1920 – 18 September 1998) was an Australian rules footballer who played with Footscray in the Victorian Football League (VFL).

He mainly played in the second eighteen, only playing four league games for the senior side but finished equal second in the Gardiner Medal in 1939.

He later served in the Royal Australian Navy at HMAS Moreton during World War II.

Notes

External links 
		

1920 births
Australian rules footballers from Victoria (Australia)
Western Bulldogs players
Australian military personnel of World War II
1998 deaths